Allan Jones may refer to:
Allan Jones (actor) (1907–1992), American actor and singer, and the father of singer Jack Jones
Allan Jones (cricketer) (born 1947), English cricket umpire and former cricketer
Allan Jones (editor) (born 1951/52), British music journalist
Allan Jones (engineer), British engineer, pioneer work on Combined Heat & Power systems
Allan Jones (footballer, born 1940) (1940–1993), Welsh footballer who played as a defender
Allan Jones (football coach), former New Zealand national football team manager
Allan Jones (businessman) (born 1952), founder of Check Into Cash
Allan Frewin Jones (born 1954), English writer

See also 
Jones (surname)
Alan Jones (disambiguation)
Allen Jones (disambiguation)
Alun Jones (disambiguation)